Jaswinder Singh is an Indian ghazal singer. He is the son and student of Kuldip Singh, composer of ghazals such as ‘Tumko dekha to ye khayal aaya’ from the movie Saath Saath and ‘Itni Shakti Hame De Na Daata’ from Ankush.

Saregama-HMV, one of the biggest music archives in India, recently launched his music album "Ishq Nahin Asaan".  Earlier, he released "Yours Truly" and "Dilkash" by Tips Music.

Jaswinder Singh has played international concerts in USA, Canada, UK, Australia, Malaysia, Singapore, Dubai and Muscat. He has performed over 300 live concerts. Jaswinder Singh also specializes in several Sufi and Punjabi songs, usually performed toward the end of his concerts.

Early life
Jaswinder Singh was born in Mumbai. He is the son of Kuldeep Singh, who composed ghazals such as Tumko dekha to ye khayal aaya and Itni shakti hame dena daata, and wrote music for the movies Saath-Saath and Ankush. He was trained in classical singing by Dr Sushila Pohankar and Pt. Ajay Pohankar, and the ghazal singer Jagjit Singh.

Career
Singh got his training in classical singing from Sushilabai and Ajay Pohankar. He was chosen to sing for the play ‘Kaifi Aur Main’, an epistolary style play dealing with the life and times of the noted lyricist and poet Kaifi Azmi. The lead actors Javed Akhtar and Shabana Azmi share anecdotes from the poet's life while Singh performs ghazals and songs penned by Kaifi Azmi.

He also performed at  Ghalibnaama, a conceptual show based on the prose and poetry of Mirza Ghalib. In July 2012, Singh sang "Bahut Yaad Aate Ho Tum" for an episode of Aamir Khan's TV series Satyamev Jayate.

Awards
He was awarded ‘The young Ghazal Maestro’ by Indian Music Academy. The title was presented by Hariprasad Chaurasia in the presence of A. P. J. Abdul Kalam.

Recordings
 " Ishq nahin aasaan " released by Saregama – HMV
 " Dilkash " released by Tips
 "Yours Truly" released by Tips
Eternal released by Artistaloud / Hungama

References

External links 
 About: Jaswinder Singh
 eBazm: Jasvinder Singh
 Gahazl's World: Jasvinder Singh

Indian male ghazal singers
Living people
Indian Sikhs
Punjabi people
Singers from Mumbai
Year of birth missing (living people)